Frontiers in Bioscience is a peer reviewed scientific journal. It was established in 1996 and covers all biological and medical sciences. The editor-in-chief is Graham Pawelec. The journal consists of three sections: Landmark Edition, Scholar Edition, and Elite Edition

Abstracting and indexing
The Landmark Edition of the journal is abstracted and indexed in:

Reception
According to the Journal Citation Reports, the journal has a 2019 impact factor of 2.747. The journal has been placed on Jeffrey Beall's list of "potential, possible, or probable" predatory scholarly open-access publishers in 2012.

References

External links
 

Biology journals
Monthly journals
Hybrid open access journals
English-language journals
Publications established in 1996